The streak-headed woodcreeper (Lepidocolaptes souleyetii) is a passerine bird which breeds in the tropical New World from southern Mexico to northwestern Peru, northern Brazil and Guyana, and also on Trinidad.

This woodcreeper is found in lowlands up to  altitude, although normally below , in damp light woodland, plantations, gardens, and clearings with trees. It builds a leaf-lined nest  up in a tree cavity, or sometimes an old woodpecker hole, and lays two white eggs.

It has olive brown upperparts with fine streaking on the crown, nape and upper back, a chestnut rump, wings and tail, and heavily streaked olive-brown underparts. Young birds are duller with less distinct streaking.

The call is a sharp rolled djeer and the song is a whistled piiiiiiiiir piiiiiiiiir piiiiiiiiir.

The streak-headed woodcreeper is very similar to the spot-crowned woodcreeper (Lepidocolaptes affinis) but is smaller, has a streaked, not spotted crown, and is found at lower altitudes.

The streak-headed woodcreeper feeds on spiders and insects, creeping up trunks and extracting its prey from the bark or mosses. It is normally seen alone or in a pair and unlike spot-crowned, rarely joins mixed-species feeding flocks.

This species' scientific name commemorates Louis François Auguste Souleyet, French zoologist and naval surgeon.

References

Further reading

External links

 
 
 
 

streak-headed woodcreeper
Birds of Central America
Birds of Colombia
Birds of Venezuela
Birds of Ecuador
streak-headed woodcreeper